A 2.5D integrated circuit (2.5D IC) combines multiple integrated circuit dies in a single package without stacking them into a three-dimensional integrated circuit (3D-IC) with through-silicon vias (TSVs). The term "2.5D" originated when 3D-ICs with TSVs were quite new and still horrendously difficult. Chip designers realized that many of the advantages of 3D integration could be approximated by placing bare dies side by side on an interposer instead of stacking them vertically. If the pitch is very fine and the interconnect very short, the assembly can be packaged as a single component with better size, weight, and power characteristics than a comparable 2D circuit board assembly. This half-way 3D integration was facetiously named "2.5D" and the name stuck.
Since those early days, 2.5D has proven to be far more than just "half-way to 3D."
Some benefits:
 An interposer can support heterogeneous integration – that is, dies of different pitch, size, material, and process node.
 Placing dies side by side instead of stacking them reduces heat buildup.
 Upgrading or modifying a 2.5D assembly is as easy as swapping in a new component and revamping the interposer to suit; much faster and simpler than reworking an entire 3D-IC or System-on-Chip (SoC).
Some sophisticated 2.5D assemblies even incorporate TSVs and 3D components. Several foundries now support 2.5D packaging.
The success of 2.5D assembly has given rise to "chiplets" – small, functional circuit blocks designed to be combined in mix-and-match fashion on interposers. Several high-end products already take advantage of these LEGO-style chiplets; some experts predict the emergence of an industry-wide chiplet ecosystem.

References

Integrated circuits